Ben Millers was a U.S. soccer club sponsored by the Ben W. Miller Hat Company of St. Louis, Missouri.  Founded in 1913, it entered the St. Louis Soccer League two years later, winning seven league titles and one National Challenge Cup before its disbandment in 1935.

History

A Ben Millers team, managed by E. Brinkman, competed in the St. Louis Association Foot Ball League during the 1904–05 season.  In 1913, Ben Millers entered the Federal Park League in St. Louis, Missouri.  The Federal Park League had been created that season after disagreements about permissible levels of professionalism had split the St. Louis Soccer League .  St. Leo's, the city’s only fully professional team joined with several other St. Louis teams, including Ben Millers, to form the Federal Park League.  This league existed only two seasons as the differences dividing the previous SLSL teams were reconciled leading to the re-establishment of the SLSL in 1915.  Ben Millers joined the reconstituted SLSL, immediately asserting its dominance by winning three consecutive league titles.  While the National Challenge Cup was established by the United States Football Association in 1914, the St. Louis teams did not enter it until 1918.  In 1920, Ben Millers became the first team outside of the northeast to win the trophy.  While they never repeated as champions, they made the final in 1926.  The team continued strong into the late 1920s but began to fade with the new decade. Frankie Vaughan took over as manager for the 1935–36 season.

Team ownership
Peter Ratican owned Ben Millers in the early 1920s.  Following his death in 1923, his widow owned the team for a time.

Record

References

External links
 St. Louis Soccer League standings

Soccer clubs in St. Louis
St. Louis Soccer League teams
Association football clubs established in 1913
Defunct soccer clubs in Missouri
1913 establishments in Missouri
1935 disestablishments in Missouri
Association football clubs disestablished in 1935
U.S. Open Cup winners